Linda Parker may refer to:

 Linda Vivienne Parker (born 1958), American judge
 Linda Parker (bowls) (born 1929), Welsh lawn and indoor bowler